The 2019 Challenger Eckental was a professional tennis tournament played on carpet courts. It was the 23rd edition of the tournament which was part of the 2019 ATP Challenger Tour. It took place in Eckental, Germany between 28 October and 3 November 2019.

Singles main-draw entrants

Seeds

 1 Rankings are as of 21 October 2019.

Other entrants
The following players received wildcards into the singles main draw:
  Niklas Guttau
  Johannes Härteis
  Jeremy Schifris
  Tobias Simon
  Leopold Zima

The following player received entry into the singles main draw as an alternate:
  Marc-Andrea Hüsler

The following players received entry from the qualifying draw:
  Viktor Durasovic
  Tomáš Macháč

The following player received entry as a lucky loser:
  Max Wiskandt

Champions

Singles

 Jiří Veselý def.  Steve Darcis 6–4, 4–6, 6–3.

Doubles

 Ken Skupski /  John-Patrick Smith def.  Sander Arends /  Roman Jebavý 7–6(7–2), 6–4.

References

2019 ATP Challenger Tour
2019
2019 in German tennis
October 2019 sports events in Germany
November 2019 sports events in Germany